Labyrinth is the sixth studio album by Swiss singer Stefanie Heinzmann. It was released by BMG Rights Management on  14 May 2022.

Critical reception

Toni Hennig from laut.de rated the album two stars out of five and found that it "sounds too much like a modular system. Labyrinth could have been an above-average album if the good approaches at the beginning had been further developed. There are clearly more important things than wasting your life with this disc, such as a walk in the fresh air or a trip to the bakery."

Track listing

Notes
 signifies a co-producer

Charts

Release history

References

2021 albums
Stefanie Heinzmann albums
BMG Rights Management albums